Aubord is a commune in the Gard department in southern France.

Population

Personalities
The Franco-German geographer Christophe Neff has lived several years  in Aubord.  During this time he considered Aubord as his Home harbor in France. In his blog he compared Aubord to the fictional village Macondo.

See also
 Costières de Nîmes AOC
Communes of the Gard department

References

Communes of Gard